A wythe is a continuous vertical section of masonry one unit in thickness.  A wythe may be independent of, or interlocked with, the adjoining wythe(s).  A single wythe of brick that is not structural in nature is referred to as a masonry veneer.

A multiple-wythe masonry wall may be composed of a single type of masonry unit layered to increase its thickness and structural strength, or different masonry units chosen by function, such as an economical concrete block serving a structural purpose and a more expensive brick chosen for its appearance.

In the Eurocodes the continuous vertical section is referred to as a 'leaf'. A single-leaf wall is a wall without a cavity or continuous vertical joint in its plane. A double-leaf wall is a
wall consisting of two parallel leaves with the longitudinal joint between filled solidly with mortar and securely tied together with wall ties so as to result in common action under load. The difference between the leaf and the wythe is found in the leaf always being joined as one structural element, while wythes may be independent of one another.

References

Masonry